Thomas Watson (1821 – 7 March 1887), was an English silk spinner and Liberal Party politician.

Watson began life as a silk spinner. In 1846 with two fellow workers, he started a silk-spinning and hatter business in Rochdale. He was responsible for the invention of silk-plush for hat-making and became sole partner in the firm of Thomas Watson & Sons, silk-plush manufacturers of Rochdale. He funded a new infirmary for the town of Rochdale, became chairman of Rochdale School Board, and treasurer of the Free Church Denomination. He was also J.P. for Rochdale.

In the 1885 general election, Watson was elected as the Member of Parliament (MP) for Ilkeston. He retained the seat in the 1886 general election, but died in 1887 at the age of 66.

References

External links 

1823 births
1887 deaths
Liberal Party (UK) MPs for English constituencies
UK MPs 1885–1886
UK MPs 1886–1892
People from Rochdale
British textile industry businesspeople
19th-century English businesspeople